René Vollath (born 20 March 1990) is a German professional footballer who plays as a goalkeeper for Regionalliga Bayern club SpVgg Unterhaching. Vollath was a youth international for Germany.

References

External links

Living people
1990 births
People from Amberg
Sportspeople from the Upper Palatinate
Association football goalkeepers
German footballers
Germany youth international footballers
TSG 1899 Hoffenheim II players
SV Wacker Burghausen players
Karlsruher SC players
KFC Uerdingen 05 players
Türkgücü München players
SpVgg Unterhaching players
3. Liga players
Regionalliga players
Footballers from Bavaria